Minacantalucio is an album by Italian singer Mina, originally distributed back to back with album La Mina. The title translates as Mina Sings Lucio, referring to the album's consisting entirely of songs composed by Lucio Battisti (and originally recorded by him except for "L'aquila", originally performed by Bruno Lauzi).

The entire album was arranged by Gabriel Yared Oscar Prize. |
Artistic Director Vittorio Buffoli. |
Artistic Coordination Osvaldo Miccichè. |
Sound Engineer Nuccio Rinaldis

Track listing

1975 albums
Mina (Italian singer) albums
Italian-language albums